is a crustacean kaiju who first appeared in Toho's 1995 film Godzilla vs. Destoroyah, as its titular main antagonist.

Overview
Destoroyah originated as a colony of microscopic Precambrian crustaceans that had been awakened and mutated in Tokyo Bay when the Oxygen Destroyer was detonated to kill the original Godzilla in 1954. In 1995, the Destoroyahs eventually mature into man-sized creatures which repel a JSDF assault. The Destoroyahs later combine into a flying form which fights Godzilla Junior. Destoroyah is defeated, but then morphs into an even larger form that is significantly larger than Godzilla and towers over Junior. The creature proceeds to kill Godzilla Junior and faces Godzilla in Haneda Airport, but is finally killed through the combined efforts of Godzilla and the army.

Development

In conceptualizing Godzilla's final adversary, screenwriter Kazuki Ōmori initially proposed having the Heisei Godzilla battle the ghost of the original 1954 Godzilla. Instead, the filmmakers settled on a new monster that was a by-product of the Oxygen Destroyer. The character was initially going to be named "Barubaroi", though this was rejected on account of it sounding too similar to Berber, and thus could have been considered offensive. The Barubaroi designs were more chimeric, in the style of the creature from The Thing, than the finalized Destoroyah look, though they shared Destoroyah's trait of surpassing Godzilla in height.

All of Destoroyah's forms were designed by Minoru Yoshida, who'd been instructed to make the creature a crustacean. His design for Destoroyah's final form was given to illustrator Noriyoshi Ohrai, who incorporated it into the movie poster. Ohrai's depiction was later used as the basis for the 3D model used in constructing the creature's suit.

Composer Akira Ifukube had initially wanted to give each of Destoroyah's forms their own motif, though he subsequently chose to give them all the same theme. He chose not to use the Oxygen Destroyer theme from the original 1954 film, as he felt that the theme expressed the tragedy of the weapon's creator, and thus was inappropriate for a monster.

Reception
Miles Imhoff of Toho Kingdom called Destoroyah "perhaps the most heartless and cruel of any kaiju to ever exist." He said "the props and suit look amazing, and are really an excellent choice for Godzilla's final Heisei foe. The reddish hues, the jagged features, and the demonic appearance of the many forms of Destoroyah are handled nicely. In fact, its wild and deadly features, coupled with its personality and several stages, can easily be seen as a loose remake of Hedorah. Destoroyah's many forms are portrayed as vicious, but it is the final form that is shown to be truly cold. The portrayal of its ruthless murder of Junior is a form of cruelty truly unseen since the vicious tooth-and-claw battles of the latter Showa entries, and it is this one act that best sums up the character Destoroyah as a whole." Complex listed the character as No. 3 on its "The 15 Most Badass Kaiju Monsters of All Time" list. Godzilla historian Steve Ryfle called Destoroyah a "nearly immobile Predator-meets-SpaceGodzilla clone", stating the character is "more laughable than menacing, and should be placed alongside Megalon and Gigan in the back rooms of the Toho monster gallery." Destoroyah was one of the inspirations behind the name of Japanese heavy metal band Destroya.

Appearances

Films
 Godzilla vs. Destoroyah (1995)

Television
 Godzilla Island (1997)

Video games
 Godzilla Trading Battle (PlayStation - 1998)
 Godzilla: Destroy All Monsters Melee (GameCube, Xbox - 2002/2003)
 Godzilla: Save the Earth (Xbox, PS2 - 2004)
 Godzilla: Unleashed (Wii, PS2 - 2007)
 Godzilla Unleashed: Double Smash (NDS - 2007) as equal Playable/Boss
 Godzilla (PS3, PS4 - 2014/2015)
 Godzilla Defense Force (2019)
 Godzilla Battle Line (2022)
 GigaBash (PS4, PS5)

Literature
 Godzilla vs. Destoroyah (manga - 1995)
 Godzilla: Legends (comic - 2011-2012)
 Godzilla: Rulers of Earth (comic - 2013-2015)
 Godzilla: Cataclysm (comic - 2014)
 Godzilla in Hell (comic - 2015)
 Godzilla: Oblivion (comic - 2016)

References

Sources
 

Fictional crustaceans
Godzilla characters
Fictional characters with superhuman strength
Fictional mass murderers
Fictional monsters
Fictional mutants
Fictional parasites and parasitoids
Fictional superorganisms
Film characters introduced in 1995
Kaiju
Science fiction film characters
Toho monsters
Horror film villains